Malayer County is in Hamadan province, Iran. The capital of the county is the city of Malayer. At the 2006 census, the county's population was 285,272 in 73,755 households. The following census in 2011 counted 287,982 people in 83,746 households. At the 2016 census, the county's population was 288,685 in 89,762 households.

Administrative divisions

The population history and structural changes of Malayer County's administrative divisions over three consecutive censuses are shown in the following table. The latest census shows four districts, 15 rural districts, and five cities.

References

 

Counties of Hamadan Province